The House of Commons (Disqualification) Act 1693 (5 & 6 Will. & Mar. c 7) was an Act of the Parliament of England.

The whole Act was repealed by section 14(1) of, and Part I of Schedule 4 to, the House of Commons Disqualification Act 1957.

The whole Act was repealed for the Republic of Ireland by section 3 of, and Schedule 1 to, the Electoral Act 1963. That Schedule describes the subject matter of this Act as "restriction on member of House of Commons from being concerned in collection of revenue".

See also
House of Commons Disqualification Act

References
Halsbury's Statutes,

External links
List of repeals in the Republic of Ireland, from the Irish Statute Book.

Acts of the Parliament of England
1693 in law
1693 in England
Acts of the Parliament of the United Kingdom concerning the House of Commons